I Wanna Be Loved By You is Claudja Barry's third studio album, released in 1978.  "(Boogie Woogie) Dancin' Shoes" by Bjoerklund, Evers, Forsey, Korduletsch was issued as a single with "Boogie Tonight".

Track listings
"(Boogie Woogie) Dancin' Shoes"	5:05	
"Cold Fire"	4:25	
"Give It Up"	5:35	
"Down By the Water"	4:55	
"I Wanna Be Loved By You"	1:30	
"Heavy Makes You Happy"	3:25	
"Nobody But You"	3:30	
"The Way You Are Dancing"	3:25	
"Boogie Tonight"	3:55	
"Love of the Hurtin' Kind"	4:30

References

External links
 Claudja Barry-I Wanna Be Loved By You at Discogs

1978 albums
Claudja Barry albums